Patrick Connor (15 March 1906 – 26 August 1989) was an Irish Fine Gael politician who served as a Teachta Dála (TD) for the Kerry South constituency from 1961 to 1969 and a Senator for the Administrative Panel from 1957 to 1961.

Connor was first elected to Seanad Éireann on his first attempt, in 1957, when he was returned as a Senator for the Administrative Panel in the 9th Seanad.

Following the retirement of Fine Gael TD Patrick Palmer, Connor stood as the Fine Gael candidate for the Kerry South constituency at the 1961 general election, and was elected to Dáil Éireann. He was re-elected at the 1965 general election, but lost his seat at the 1969 general election to his Fine Gael running-mate, Michael Begley. He did not contest any further elections.

References

1906 births
1989 deaths
Fine Gael TDs
Members of the 9th Seanad
Members of the 17th Dáil
Members of the 18th Dáil
Fine Gael senators